Tirgatao (Ancient Greek: ,) was a princess of the Maeotes mentioned by  Polyaenus. She was the first wife of the Sindian king Hecataeus, and was a notable participant of the Bosporan wars of expansion.

Name
The name Tirgataō is the Hellenisation of the Scythian language name , meaning "with the strength of an arrow."

In the texts 
Polyaenus tells us the story of Tirgatao in his book Stratagems:

See also

Related articles 
 Maeotes

External links 
 Page on Tirgatao on Rejectedprincesses.com

References

Iranic women
Scythian people
Women in war